Calice al Cornoviglio is a comune (municipality) in the Province of La Spezia in the Italian region Liguria, located about  southeast of Genoa and about  north of La Spezia.

Calice al Cornoviglio borders the following municipalities: Beverino, Follo, Mulazzo, Podenzana, Rocchetta di Vara, Tresana.

References

Cities and towns in Liguria